Cees van Kooten (20 August 1948 – 24 August 2015) was a Dutch former international football striker. After his career he became a football manager, he retired after a heart attack. He died of cancer in 2015.

With 79 goals in six seasons he was the topscorer of Go Ahead Eagles.

References

External links
 
 
 

1948 births
2015 deaths
Dutch footballers
Dutch football managers
Deaths from cancer in the Netherlands
Deaths from esophageal cancer
Netherlands international footballers
Association football forwards
FC Utrecht players
Lille OSC players
Ligue 1 players
Hermes DVS players
SC Telstar players
Go Ahead Eagles players
PEC Zwolle players
Dutch expatriate footballers
Expatriate footballers in France
People from Alblasserdam
RKC Waalwijk managers
NEC Nijmegen managers
Association football midfielders
Footballers from South Holland